Vastese (Vastese:  or , meaning "the dialect of Vasto") is a Romance language spoken in the town of Vasto.  of it and Italian.

History
This term is known to have originated in the sixth century AD.

Demography
Today Vastese is spoken monolingually only by residents of Vasto in their 80s and 90s, bilingually by many residents in their 70s, and many middle-aged residents are passive speakers, while most younger residents have no comprehension.

The Vasto Club in Australia is a club organized for migrants to Australia from Vasto.

Phonology
Vastese has more vowel distinctions than Tuscan, Italy's official and standard language. It has vowels that are not in Italian, such as the open front unrounded vowel . Vastese uses an open back rounded vowel  for the start of the word . It also uses the mid central vowel .

References

See also 
 Central Italian
 Southern Italian
 Languages of Italy
 Abruzzo

Romance languages
Endangered Romance languages